James Burton Reynolds (February 17, 1870 – February 7, 1948) was Assistant Secretary of the Treasury, where he was accused of taking bribes from the Sugar Trust.

Early life
He was born in Saratoga, New York, on February 17, 1870, and was the son of Dr. John H. Reynolds and Sarah ( Morgan) Reynolds. He attended Glens Falls Academy and graduated from Dartmouth College in 1890.

Career
In 1905, President Theodore Roosevelt appointed Reynolds an Assistant Secretary of the Treasury. In September 1909, Reynolds was appointed by President William Howard Taft. He resigned from the Treasury effective November 1, 1909, to focus on the Tariff Commission.

In 1913 he was Secretary of the Republican National Committee. In 1920 he was the campaign manager for Calvin Coolidge.

Personal life
On December 28, 1912, Reynolds was married to Irene ( Holcombe) Hearin (1867–1943) in Mobile, Alabama. Irene, a daughter of Dr. James Mosely Holcombe and Rhidonia Alabama Augustine ( Hearin) Holcombe, was the widow of Charles Turner Hearin, with whom she had several children. 

He died in New York City on February 7, 1948.

References

1870 births
1948 deaths
People from Saratoga, New York
United States Assistant Secretaries of the Treasury